Gaspésie—Les Îles-de-la-Madeleine is a federal electoral district in Quebec, Canada, that has been represented in the House of Commons of Canada since 2004.

It was created by the Representation Order of 2003 from parts of Bonaventure—Gaspé—Îles-de-la-Madeleine—Pabok and Matapédia—Matane ridings.

As per the 2012 federal electoral redistribution, the former riding of Gaspésie—Îles-de-la-Madeleine was dissolved, largely being replaced by Gaspésie—Les Îles-de-la-Madeleine, and the rest going to Avignon—La Mitis—Matane—Matapédia, while gaining territory from Haute-Gaspésie—La Mitis—Matane—Matapédia.

Geography

The riding occupies the eastern part of the Gaspé Peninsula, as well as the Magdalen Islands. The Magdalen Islands, being in the Atlantic time zone, report election results one hour earlier than the rest of the riding, which in the Eastern Time Zone with the rest of Quebec.

From 2004 to 2011 it consisted of:

(a) the regional county municipalities of Bonaventure, La Côte-de-Gaspé and Le Rocher-Percé;
(b) the Regional County Municipality of Avignon, including Gesgapegiag and Listuguj Indian reserves; and
(c) the Municipality of Les Îles-de-la-Madeleine.

Following the 2013 redistribution, the riding lost the RCM of Avignon but gained the RCM of La Haute-Gaspésie.

Demographics
According to the Canada 2016 Census

 Languages: (2016) 91.5% French, 8.1% English, 0.1% Spanish

Member of Parliament

This riding has elected the following Member of Parliament:

Election results

Gaspésie—Les Îles-de-la-Madeleine, 2013 Representation Order

Gaspésie—Îles-de-la-Madeleine, 2003 Representation Order

See also
 List of Canadian federal electoral districts
 Past Canadian electoral districts

References

Campaign expense data from Elections Canada
2011 Results from Elections Canada
Riding history from the Library of Parliament

Notes

Quebec federal electoral districts
Gaspé, Quebec